Erastus G. Smith was a member of the Wisconsin State Assembly and Dean of Beloit College.

Biography
Smith was born on April 30, 1855 in South Hadley, Massachusetts. He graduated from Amherst College and the University of Göttingen. On December 26, 1883, he married Elizabeth Mayher. Gilbert Morgan Smith was among their children. Smith died of a myocardial infarction on June 19, 1937. He was buried in Beloit, Wisconsin.

Academic career
Smith became Professor of Chemistry at Beloit College in 1881. He retired as Professor Emeritus in 1921. From 1903 to 1904, he served as Dean.

Political career
Smith was a member of the Assembly during the 1927, 1929 and 1931 sessions. Previously, he was Mayor of Beloit from 1887 to 1888, 1888-1889, 1891 to 1892 and 1924 to 1926. He was a Republican.

References

External links

RootsWeb

1855 births
1937 deaths
People from South Hadley, Massachusetts
American Congregationalists
Republican Party members of the Wisconsin State Assembly
Mayors of places in Wisconsin
Politicians from Beloit, Wisconsin
American university and college faculty deans
Amherst College alumni
University of Göttingen alumni
Beloit College faculty
Burials in Wisconsin